The Second Unitarian Church is a historic church and synagogue building at 11 Charles Street in Brookline, Massachusetts.  Built in 1916 for a Unitarian congregation, it was acquired by the innovative Reform Jewish Temple Sinai congregation in 1944.  It is a high quality example of Colonial Revival/Georgian Revival architecture, and was listed on the National Register of Historic Places in 1985.

Description and history
The Temple Sinai building is located on the north side of Charles Street, a side street just south of Beacon Street on the west side of Coolidge Corner.  The building's lot originally fronted on Beacon Street, but has been subdivided.  The building is a two-story brick structure, with a front-facing gable roof, Greek temple portico, and tower with octagonal cupola.  The building corners have brick quoining, and it has round-arch windows capped by limestone keystones.

The building was erected in 1916 by the Second Unitarian Church, a congregation established in 1896 that had been meeting at a shared chapel in the Longwood area.  The building was designed by Boston architect Edwin J. Lewis, and is based on the Christ Church in Alexandria, Virginia.  In 1944 the building was purchased by Temple Sinai, a Reform Jewish congregation established in 1939.  That congregation was the first new Reform congregation to be founded in the Greater Boston area in 84 years, and is credited with introducing a number of changes to the worship and governance practices of Reform congregations, including equal seating for all congregants, and the right of women to vote in its organization.

See also
National Register of Historic Places listings in Brookline, Massachusetts

References

External links
Temple Sinai website

Churches on the National Register of Historic Places in Massachusetts
Colonial Revival architecture in Massachusetts
Unitarian Universalist churches in Massachusetts
Churches completed in 1916
20th-century Unitarian Universalist church buildings
Churches in Brookline, Massachusetts
National Register of Historic Places in Brookline, Massachusetts
Historic district contributing properties in Massachusetts